Kristian Tambs (25 May 1951 – 13 June 2017) was a Norwegian psychologist.

He took the doctorate at the University of Oslo in 1989, was then a postdoc fellow at the Virginia Commonwealth University until 1991, when he hired at the Norwegian Institute of Public Health. He was a member of the Norwegian Academy of Science and Letters.

References

1951 births
2017 deaths
Norwegian psychologists
University of Oslo alumni
Norwegian expatriates in the United States
Members of the Norwegian Academy of Science and Letters